Saccharopolyspora flava  is a Gram-positive and aerobic bacterium from the genus Saccharopolyspora which has been isolated from garden soil in China.

References

 

Pseudonocardineae
Bacteria described in 2001